Rheometry generically refers to the experimental techniques used to determine the rheological properties of materials, that is the qualitative and quantitative relationships between stresses and strains and their derivatives. The techniques used are experimental. Rheometry investigates materials in relatively simple flows like steady shear flow, small amplitude oscillatory shear, and extensional flow.

The choice of the adequate experimental technique depends on the rheological property which has to be determined. This can be the steady shear viscosity, the linear viscoelastic properties (complex viscosity respectively elastic modulus), the elongational properties, etc.

For all real materials, the measured property will be a function of the flow conditions during which it is being measured (shear rate, frequency, etc.) even if for some materials this dependence is vanishingly low under given conditions (see Newtonian fluids).

Rheometry is a specific concern for smart fluids such as electrorheological fluids and magnetorheological fluids, as it is the primary method to quantify the useful properties of these materials.

Rheometry is considered useful in the fields of quality control, process control, and industrial process modelling, among others. For some, the techniques, particularly the qualitative rheological trends, can yield the classification of materials based on the main interactions between different possible elementary components and how they qualitatively affect the rheological behavior of the materials.

Of non-Newtonian fluids
The viscosity of a non-Newtonian fluid is defined by a power law:

where η is the viscosity after shear is applied, η0 is the initial viscosity, γ is the shear rate, and if
, the fluid is shear thinning,
, the fluid is shear thickening,
, the fluid is Newtonian.

In rheometry, shear forces are applied to non-Newtonian fluids in order to investigate their properties.

Shear thinning fluids
Due to the shear thinning properties of blood, computational fluid dynamics (CFD) is used to assess the risk of aneurysms.  Using High-Resolution solution strategies, the results when using non-Newtonian rheology were found to be negligible.

Shear thickening fluids
A method for testing the behavior of shear thickening fluids is stochastic rotation dynamics-molecular dynamics (SRD-MD).  The colloidal particles of a shear thickening fluid are simulated, and shear is applied.  These particles create hydroclusters which exert a drag force resisting flow.

See also
Continuum mechanics
Dynamic shear rheometer
Electrorheological fluid
Ferrofluid
Fluid mechanics
Magnetorheological fluid
Rheology
Rheometer
Smart fluid

References

Continuum mechanics
Fluid mechanics